The Coulibistrie River is a river on the Caribbean island of Dominica.  It flows from the interior westward through a deep valley, and empties into the Caribbean Sea north of Batalie Bay.  It is fast-flowing, with small rapids and numerous bathing pools.

The village of Coulibistrie lines its banks near its outlet.

See also
List of rivers of Dominica

References

External links
Map of Dominica
 GEOnet Names Server
Water Resources Assessment of Dominica, Antigua and Barbuda, and St. Kitts and Nevis

Rivers of Dominica